Julie Biteen is a Canadian-born American chemist who is professor of chemistry and biophysics at the University of Michigan. Her research considers the development of imaging systems for biological systems. She was named the Stanford University Sessler Distinguished Alumni Lecturer in 2021.

Early life and education 
Biteen was born in Montreal. Her father worked in Human Resources and her mother was a librarian. As a child she enjoyed mathematics and thought that she might become a civil engineer. During her undergraduate studies she became fascinated by fundamental scientific research. Biteen majored in chemistry at Princeton University and worked under the supervision of Hershel Rabitz, where she studied maps for quantum control. After completing her bachelor's degree she moved to the California Institute of Technology (Caltech), where she worked toward a master's in applied physics. She stayed at Caltech for her doctoral research, working alongside Harry Atwater and Nathan Lewis. Her doctoral research considered nanoparticle plasmonics and quantum dot optoelectronics. She joined Stanford University as a postdoctoral scholar, where she worked on super-resolution imaging with William E. Moerner. As a postdoc she developed photoactivated localization microscopy systems to image Caulobacter crescentus, acquiring the first images of MreB, a protein found in bacteria.

Research and career 
Biteen was appointed to the faculty at the University of Michigan in 2010. She investigates microbial cell biology using advanced imaging techniques such as single-molecule and super-resolution imaging. In particular, single-molecule microscopy can provide nanoscale information about biological processes. She has used these techniques to understand how proteins recognise and bind histones during transcriptional silencing and to reveal information about the gut microbiome. At the same time she has studied how plasmonic metal nanoantennas reshape the fluorescence of nearby molecules.

Awards and honors 
 2009 University of Michigan Biological Sciences Scholar
 2009 Burroughs Wellcome Fund Career Award
 2013 NSF CAREER Award
 2015 Moore Foundation Scialog Fellow
 2016 Journal of Physical Chemistry B Lectureship Award
 2017 Biophysical Society Margaret Oakley Dayhoff Award
 2020 NSF Award for Special Creativity
 2021 Sessler Distinguished Alumni Lectureship at Stanford

Selected publications

References 

Living people
Scientists from Montreal
California Institute of Technology alumni
Princeton University alumni
University of Michigan faculty
American women chemists
21st-century American scientists
Year of birth missing (living people)
21st-century American women scientists